"One Look (One Look Was Enough)" is a 1988 dance single by San Francisco based disco/dance singer Paul Parker.  The single was his second of two entries to make it to #1 on the dance charts.  Parker's singles charted exclusively on the dance charts.

References

1987 singles
Techno songs
1987 songs